Kopua japonica, the Japanese ceepwater clingfish, is a clingfish of the family Gobiesocidae, found in the Northwest Pacific, the East China Sea and Japan.

References

Moore, G.I., B. Hutchins and M. Okamoto, 2012. A new species of the deepwater clingfish genus Kopua (Gobiesociformes: Gobiesocidae) from the East China Sea - an example of antitropicality? Zootaxa 3380:34-38

japonica
Endemic marine fish of New Zealand
Taxa named by Glenn I. Moore
Taxa named by J. Barry Hutchins
Taxa named by Makoto Okamoto
Fish described in 2012